Qaleh-ye Amir Khan or Qaleh Amir Khan may refer to:
 Qaleh-ye Amir Khan, Hamadan
 Qaleh-ye Amir Khan, North Khorasan